Klaus Hottinger was a shoemaker born in Zollikon. A disciple of Zwingli, he took part in the famous "Affair of the Sausages" of 1522 which marked the public beginning of the Reformation in Switzerland. In 1523 he overthrew a wooden crucifix at Stadelhofen on the outskirts of Zurich. He was as a consequence banished from the canton in November 1523. He was executed in Lucerne on 9 March 1524, despite Zurich's effort to intervene on his behalf, and thus became the first martyr of the Swiss Protestant movement.

Notes

References
 

: "A band of citizens, under the lead of a shoemaker, Klaus Hottinger, overthrew the great wooden crucifix in Stadelhofen, near the city, and committed other ..."

External links
 Global Anabaptist Mennonite Encyclopedia Online (GAMEO)
 Hottinger Genealogy in French
 Philip Schaff, History of the Christian Church

16th-century Protestant martyrs
1524 deaths
Swiss Protestants
16th-century Swiss people
Klaus
Year of birth unknown